Fireplace: TheNotTheOtherSide is the debut album by American rapper Hodgy. It was released on December 9, 2016, by Odd Future Records and Columbia Records. It features guest appearances from Lil Wayne, Busta Rhymes, and Salomon Faye. It is supported by three singles, "Barbell", "Final Hour" and "Glory."

Track listing

Notes
 "Resurrection" features additional vocals by Sarah Winters.

Sample credits
 "They Want" contains a sample from "A Man Alone" written and performed by Alan Hawkshaw
 "Final Hour" contains a sample from "Indian Reservation (The Lament of the Cherokee Reservation Indian)" written by J.D. Loudermilk and performed by Paul Revere & the Raiders
 "Dreaminofthinkin" contains samples from "No Other Love" written by Myron Davis & Joshua Honigstock performed by Myron
 "The Now" contains samples from "Voglia D'Amore" written by Franco Pisano, Jr. and performed by Berto and Junior Pisano Orchestra with Edda Dell'Orso
 "DYSLM" contains samples from "It's So Different Here" written by Liam Sternberg and performed by Rachel Sweet

Personnel 
Credits for Fireplace: TheNotTheOtherSide adapted from his official website and AllMusic

 Hodgy – primary artist, artwork
 Vic Wainstein – engineer, mixing, recorder, writer
 Mike Bozzi – mastering
 Russel Lee – layout
 Chris & Kelly Clancy of 4 Strikes – management
 Preston Hui of 4 Strikes – project manager
 Judy Miller Silverman & Spencer Kilgore of Motormouth Media – publicity
 Salomon Faye – featured artist, writer
 Ruban Nielson – writer
 Unknown Mortal Orchestra – producers
 Jonti Danilewitz – producer, writer
 Columbus Smith III – producer, writer
 Sarah Winters – additional vocals
 Dominick Lamb – producer, writer
 Charles Njapa – producer, writer
 Trevor Smith Jr. – featured artist, writer
 Tony Cottrell – producer, writer
 Matthew Tavares – producer, engineer, mixing, writer
 Alexander Sowinski – producer, writer
 Chester Hansen – producer, writer
 Leland Whitty – producer, writer
 Dwayne Carter – featured artist, writer
 Glen Boothe – producer, writer
 Garcia Bros. – producers, writers

References

2016 debut albums
Odd Future Records albums
Albums produced by Knxwledge
Albums produced by BadBadNotGood